Nowferest (also Romanized as Naufirist and Now Forşat) is a village in Baqeran Rural District, in the Central District of Birjand County, South Khorasan Province, Iran. At the 2006 census, its population was 353, in 137 families.

References 

Populated places in Birjand County